Eteri Liparteliani (born 23 September 1999) is a Georgian judoka. She competed in the women's 57 kg event at the 2020 Summer Olympics held in Tokyo, Japan.

She is the silver medallist of the 2021 Judo Grand Slam Tbilisi in the -57 kg category.

References

External links
 
 
 

1999 births
Living people
Female judoka from Georgia (country)
Judoka at the 2019 European Games
European Games competitors for Georgia (country)
Judoka at the 2020 Summer Olympics
Olympic judoka of Georgia (country)
21st-century women from Georgia (country)